Paracraga innocens is a moth in the family Dalceridae. It was described by Schaus in 1905. 

The length of the forewings is 9–11 mm for males and 12–14 mm for females. Adults are on wing from October to July.

References

Moths described in 1905
Dalceridae